Autosticha bilobella is a moth in the family Autostichidae. It was described by Kyu-Tek Park and Chun-Sheng Wu in 2003. It is found in Guangdong, China.

The wingspan is 11–12 mm. The forewings are brownish orange with blackish scales, sparsely scattered irregularly. There is a blackish spot at the extreme base on the costa and another on the inner margin. The costa is almost fuscous before the middle. The discal stigmata are relatively large, the first at the middle, the plical elongate, placed obliquely below the first and second at the end of the cell. There are three to four fuscous dots along the pre-apical part of the costa and four or five along the termen. The tornus is suffused with fuscous scales. The hindwings are pale grey.

Etymology
The species name is derived from the shape of the aedeagus, which is forked into two branches.

References

Moths described in 2003
Autosticha
Moths of Asia